Emotions in virtual communication differ in a variety of ways from those in face-to-face interactions due to the characteristics of computer-mediated communication (CMC).  CMC may lack many of the auditory and visual cues normally associated with the emotional aspects of interactions.  Research in this area has investigated how and when individuals display and interpret various emotions in virtual settings.

Expression

While text-based communication eliminates audio and visual cues, there are other methods for adding emotion.  Emoticons, or emotional icons, can be used to display various types of emotions.  Similar to emotional displays in face-to-face communication, it was found that females tend to use more emoticons than their male counterparts.  Beyond simply using emoticons, in virtual communication platforms, people tend to capitalize letters or words to add emphasis to speaking.

There are a variety of characteristics of virtual communication that result in an increase in the amount of emotion displayed.  The lack of social cues in CMC has been found to have a depersonalizing effect.  Additionally, there can be greater anonymity or perceptions of anonymity in virtual communication.  This combination of anonymous and social detached communication has been shown to increase the likelihood of flaming, or angry and hostile language as a result of uninhibited behavior.

Furthermore, it has been shown that virtual communication can reduce normative social pressures.  As a result of decreased social pressures, individuals may feel more comfortable disclosing either positive or negative affect, which may not be considered appropriate in normal face-to-face interactions.  For example, in a large part due to decreased social hierarchies, Gilmore and Warren (2007) found many instances of feelings of intimacy, playfulness, and pride in a virtual teaching environment.

Interpretation
The lack of social and emotional cues over virtual communication platforms can result in increased instances of misinterpreting emotion and intentions.  Kruger, Epley, Parker, and Ng (2005) found that individuals overestimate both their ability to clearly relay and interpret emotions via email. They attribute this inability to relay emotions effectively to others over CMC to a combination of egocentrism and a lack of paralinguistic cues including gestures, emphasis, and intonations.

One of the reasons that emails that are intended to be positive may come across as more neutral is that the process of email itself tends to be less stimulating than face-to-face communication.  Since many people tend to associate emails with work-related matters, they come to expect less positive affect to be displayed in emails.  Furthermore, the emotional ambiguity of email messages may actually lead to them to be interpreted as more negatively than they were intended. Byron (2008) notes that emails from senders higher in status will be more likely be perceived as negative than emails received from people who are lower in status.

Given the permanent and potentially public nature of virtual communication, it is much more likely that unintended parties will view and interpret messages as opposed face-to-face communication, which is fleeting.  It has been found that when third parties view virtual communications, the third parties may interpret interactions as contentious disputes, when in fact there may not have actually been any conflict.

Management

Due to the excess disclosure of and the potential to misinterpret emotions, conflicts can arise in virtual communication.  Communication mediums that have the greatest amount of emotional cues and immediacy of feedback will be best to reduce conflict.  Increased emotional cues allow for better detection of negative affect, and greater displays of positive affect to counter any negative emotions.  Immediacy of feedback relates to how quickly messages are transmitted via a particular communication medium, and the expectation for which they will be responded.  For example, instant messaging has a higher degree of immediacy of feedback than email because instant messaging tends to result in much more synchronous communication than email.  Immediacy of feedback allows individuals to detect and address frustration and other negative emotions more quickly.  Furthermore, communication mediums that are more synchronous better allow for spontaneous comments, such as jokes, which are necessary for positive affect.  Increased positive affect helps to create positive interactions which reduce the likelihood of conflict.

See also
Affective computing
Computer-mediated communication
Media richness theory
Social presence theory
Theories of technology

References

Emotion
Human–machine interaction